Bundibugyo Airport  is an airport serving the town of Bundibugyo in the Western Region of Uganda.

See also
Transport in Uganda
List of airports in Uganda

References

External links
OpenStreetMap - Bundibugyo
Bundibugyo Airport

Bundibugyo District
Airports in Uganda
Western Region, Uganda